The J-class was a class of twenty trams built by the Meadowbank Manufacturing Company, Sydney for the Prahran & Malvern Tramways Trust (PMTT). All passed to the Melbourne & Metropolitan Tramways Board on 2 February 1920 when it took over the PMTT becoming the J-class retaining their running numbers.

In 1928, seven (64-68, 71 and 75) were sold to the Melbourne Electric Supply Company for use on the Geelong network. In 1931, 73, 76 and 82 were sold to Ballarat and 79 and 83 renumbered 14 and 13 to Bendigo. After the Geelong network closed in 1956, 64-68 and 71 moved to Ballarat. As part of a Museum Collection number 14 Pictured above

Preservation
Five have been preserved:
68 by the Ballarat Tramway Museum as Ballarat number 13
71 by the Sydney Tramway Museum as Ballarat number 12
73 by the Tramway Museum Society of Victoria as Ballarat number 17
75 by the Ballarat Tramway Museum as Ballarat number 14
76 by the Bendigo Tramway as Bendigo number 7

References

Melbourne tram vehicles
600 V DC multiple units